Jeremy Jonathan Groome (born 7 April 1955) is a former English cricketer.  Groome was a right-handed batsman who bowled right-arm off break.  He was born at Aldwick, Bognor Regis, Sussex and educated at Seaford College.

In July 1974, Groome featured in a single Youth Test match for England Young Cricketers against the touring West Indies Young Cricketers.  Earlier in that same season, Groome made his first-class debut for Sussex against Northamptonshire in the 1974 County Championship.  He made 39 further first-class appearances for the county, the last of which came against Gloucestershire in the 1978 County Championship.  In his 40 first-class matches for Sussex, he scored a total of 1,120 runs at an average of 15.77, with a high score of 86.  One of six first-class half centuries he made, this score came against Middlesex in 1975.  Groome made his debut in List A cricket for the county in his debut season, against Kent in the Benson & Hedges Cup.  He made 43 further List A appearances for the county, the last of which came against Gloucestershire in the 1978 John Player League.  In his 44 List A appearances, he scored a total of 572 runs at an average of 15.45, with a high score of 72.

References

External links
Jeremy Groome at ESPNcricinfo
Jeremy Groome at CricketArchive

1955 births
Living people
People educated at Seaford College
People from Bognor Regis
English cricketers
Sussex cricketers